Naufal Ilham (born 16 August 2002) is a Singaporean footballer currently playing as a midfielder for Tanjong Pagar United.

Club

Tanjong Pagar United
He made his debut against Geylang International.

Career statistics

Club

Notes

International statistics

U19 International caps

U16 International caps

Honours

Club
Home United
COE U19 Challenge Cup 3rd place: 2018

References

2002 births
Living people
Singaporean footballers
Association football defenders
Singapore Premier League players
Lion City Sailors FC players